Burt Lacklen Talcott (February 22, 1920 – July 29, 2016) was an American World War II veteran and politician who served seven terms as a member of the United States Congress from the State of California from 1963 to 1977.

Military career
Born in Billings, Montana, Talcott received his degree from Stanford University in 1942, after which he enlisted in the United States Army Air Corps where he became a bomber pilot. On a mission in a B-24 over Austria, Talcott was shot down and captured, spending 14 months in a German Prisoner-of-war camp. Upon his discharge from the military in 1945 he received the Air Medal and Purple Heart with clusters.

Political career
Talcott served on the Monterey County, California Board of Supervisors and was president of the county board. Talcott was elected to the 88th United States Congress as a Republican and served an additional seven terms (January 3, 1963 – January 3, 1977) before losing his seat in 1976 to Leon Panetta in a close race, as Panetta prevailed with 53% of the vote.

Following his loss, Talcott engaged in a variety of private and public legislative work.

Personal life
He resided in Tacoma, Washington with his son and daughter-in-law, Ron & "Gigi" Talcott. He always made time for his faith and his family.  He was elected to serve on the Charter Review Commission Dist. 7 Pos. 3 of Pierce County. His wife, Lee Taylor, whom he married in 1942, died in 2010. He died in Tacoma on July 29, 2016 at the age of 96. Both Lee and Burt played active roles in the raising of their two grandchildren and six great-grandchildren. He could be found supporting his alma mater, Stanford, and making milkshake bets with his great-grandson over the outcome of their football games.  The year he passed, he took a 10-hour road trip to Idaho, just to watch his 3rd eldest great-granddaughter graduate from high school.

See also

Glenn E. Coolidge

References

External links

1920 births
2016 deaths
20th-century American politicians
American prisoners of war in World War II
County supervisors in California
Politicians from Billings, Montana
Recipients of the Air Medal
Republican Party members of the United States House of Representatives from California
Shot-down aviators
Stanford University alumni
California lawyers
United States Army Air Forces officers
United States Army Air Forces pilots of World War II
World War II prisoners of war held by Germany
20th-century American lawyers